Patrick Wolrige Gordon (10 August 1935 – 22 May 2002), was a Scottish Conservative and Unionist Party politician.

Biography
Wolrige-Gordon  was one of twin sons of Captain Robert Wolrige-Gordon, MC and his wife Joan Walter, the daughter of Dame Flora MacLeod, the 28th Chief of the Clan MacLeod. He was educated at Eton College and at New College, Oxford and served as a lieutenant in the Argyll and Sutherland Highlanders.

Career
Patrick Wolrige-Gordon was elected Conservative and Unionist Member of Parliament (MP) for East Aberdeenshire in November 1958 at a by-election when he was still an undergraduate. He was at the time the youngest MP.

He married Anne Howard, daughter of Peter Howard, in 1962 and became involved through Howard in Frank Buchman's Moral Re-Armament (MRA) movement, which attracted much negative comment. He fell out with his local association over the matter and was defeated in the February 1974 general election by the Scottish National Party candidate Douglas Henderson.

Honours
He was appointed a Liveryman of the Worshipful Company of Wheelwrights in 1966.

Family
Wolrige-Gordon had a son and two daughters. His twin brother John (1935–2007) changed his name to John MacLeod of MacLeod to take up the role of 29th Clan Chieftain, which he inherited from their grandmother.

External links

Obituary for John MacLeod, brother of Patrick Wolrige-Gordon

1935 births
2002 deaths
Members of the Parliament of the United Kingdom for Scottish constituencies
Scottish Conservative Party MPs
People educated at Eton College
Alumni of New College, Oxford
UK MPs 1955–1959
UK MPs 1959–1964
UK MPs 1964–1966
UK MPs 1966–1970
UK MPs 1970–1974
Argyll and Sutherland Highlanders officers
Unionist Party (Scotland) MPs